Thomas Morrow may refer to:

 Thomas Morrow (Australian politician) (1888–1971), member of the New South Wales General Assembly 1922–1925
 Thomas Z. Morrow (1835–1913), legislator and circuit court judge from Kentucky
 Tom Morrow (American football) (1938–2018), American football player
 Tom Morrow (footballer) (1923–2002), Australian rules footballer
 Tom Morrow (artist) (1928–1994), American commercial artist and theatre poster designer
 Thomas Morrow, a character on the television series NCIS
 Tom Morrow, the fictitious, eponymous host of the Disney attraction Innoventions

See also
 Thomas Morrow Reavley (1921-2020), United States judge
 Morrow (surname)